Wang Xianzhi (344–386), courtesy name Zijing (子敬), was a famous Chinese calligrapher of the Eastern Jin dynasty.

He was the seventh and youngest son of the famed Wang Xizhi. Wang inherited his father's talent for the art, and although several of his siblings were notable calligraphers, only Xianzhi was able to eventually equal his father in status, with the pair later attaining the appellation, "The Two Wangs (二王 èr wáng)." Wang Xianzhi's (also referred to as "Wang Junior" 小王) style is substantially more fluid and stylistic than that of his father ("Wang Senior" 大王), whose structural firmness nonetheless remains unrivaled. Xianzhi's most celebrated accomplishment is his refinement of the "running-cursive" script (行草), a writing style which, as the name implies, combines features of both the cursive and running scripts. The Duck-Head Pill Note is an outstanding example of this technique. Another of Xianzhi's accomplishments is the extensive application of the "one-stroke writing" technique for (cursive script), historically (though perhaps incorrectly) attributed to Zhang Zhi (張芝) of the Late Han, which strings together several characters (typically three to four) into a single stroke or renders a complex character in a rather convoluted single stroke. Until the Tang dynasty, Wang Xianzhi's influence and reputation largely surpassed that of his father.

Wang Xizhi noticed Xianzhi's talent early on and started training him in calligraphy at around the age of seven. According to one popular anecdote, Wang Xizhi once unsuccessfully tried to snatch Xianzhi's brush from behind while the latter was writing. Being amazed at Xianzhi's strong grip, Wang Xizhi remarked, "This son of mine is destined for fame!" Wang Xianzhi continued to practiced diligently into adulthood until finally becoming as skilled as his father. Xianzhi died at age 42 while still in his prime. By comparison, his father did not produce many of the works he is most known for until his late forties and fifties, including the work he is most well known for (though this attribution remains controversial), Lantingji Xu or Preface to the Poems Composed at the Orchid Pavilion. Along with his father Wang Xizhi, Zhong Yao (鐘繇) and Zhang Zhi, Wang Xianzhi is recognized as one of the "Four Worthies of Calligraphy (書中四賢  shūzhōng sìxián)."

References 

 Pang, Shutian, "Wang Xianzhi". Encyclopedia of China (Arts Edition), 1st ed.

External links 
 Wang Xianzhi and his Calligraphy Gallery at China Online Museum
 Wang Xianzhi 王獻之 法帖 翻譯 英譯 Translation Interpretation I

344 births
386 deaths
Jin dynasty (266–420) calligraphers
4th-century Chinese calligraphers